WISL may refer to:

 Western Indoor Soccer League, a United States indoor soccer league (2014-present)
 World Indoor Soccer League, a United States indoor soccer league (1998 - 2001)
 WISL (AM), a defunct AM radio station located in Shamokin, Pennsylvania
 Where Is the Love?, a song by Hip-Hop group The Black Eyed Peas